Harta Berdarah (Indonesian for Bloody Treasure) is a 1940 action film from the Dutch East Indies (now Indonesia). Directed by Rd Ariffien and R Hu for Union Films, the film was written by Saeroen. The film, which stars Zonder and Soelastri, tells of a young man who convinces a stingy hadji to be more charitable and, in the process, falls in love with the man's daughter.

Released during Eid al-Fitr, Harta Berdarah was advertised as a "magnificent Indonesian action hit" and used Zonder's silat skills and Soelastri's fame as a keroncong singer to draw audiences. Reviews for the work were positive, with praise focused on its acting and story. Although Harta Berdarah was screened as late as 1944, as with most contemporary productions it is now likely lost.

Plot
In the village of Soekasari, Mardjan (Oedjang) is forcefully evicting people who are unable to pay their taxes to his boss, the landlord Hadji Doerachman (Moesa). Doerachman, though aware of this, is unwilling to stop him, even after his daughter, Atikah (Soelastri), tries to convince him.

Mardjan and his men evict Asmadi, his wife Tjitjih (RS Fatimah), and Asmadi's sick mother. When Asmadi resists, Mardjan beats and detains him. Meanwhile, a young man named Rachmat (Zonder) is visiting his aunt in Soekasari. Learning of Mardjan's dealings, Rachmat finds him at Doerachman's home and insists that Mardjan stop. When Mardjan and his men try to fight, Rachmat overpowers them and negotiates Asmadi's release. Afterwards, Rachmat goes back to his aunt's home. Asmadi returns to his, only to learn that his mother had died shortly after the eviction; he swears revenge.

One day, Rachmat hears screaming and finds Atikah, who has fainted after seeing a snake. After she regains consciousness, Atikah thanks him for rescuing her. Although Rachmat is disgusted that he has helped her after learning the identity of Atikah's father, as Rachmat and Atikah dedicate their time to social work, they begin to fall in love. Doerachman, however, disapproves of their relationship, and refuses to fund their work; as a result, Atikah takes her deceased mother's jewellery and some money to pay for village development. Later, when Rachmat and Atikah are sitting together and singing romantic songs, Mardjan overhears them. Hurrying back to Doerachman's home, Mardjan convinces his boss that Rachmat intends only to steal Doerachman's wealth, and to let Mardjan marry Atikah. As Doerachman prepares to leave, Mardjan has the illiterate hadji put his seal on a letter.

In preparation for her marriage to Mardjan, Atikah is secluded at home. Learning of this betrothal, Rachmat goes to Doerachman and, after fighting Mardjan and his men, takes the hadji to the village where he and Atikah had initiated development programs. As they had all worked in Doerachman's name, the villagers do not fear him, but respect him. This, and the extent of the developments, makes Doerachman realise that hoarding his wealth for himself does not make him as happy as using it for charity. The two, accompanied by Asmadi, hurry back to Doerachman's home, only to find Mardjan and his men sitting relaxedly on the front porch.

After he is accosted by Doerachman, Mardjan reveals that the letter which Doerachman signed was actually a statement granting Mardjan all of the hadji's wealth. Furious at Mardjan's behaviour, Asmadi attacks him while Rachmat restrains the others. After a lengthy knife fight, Mardjan's foot is caught in the railroad tracks, and he is soon killed by a passing train. Doerachman, pleased with the return of his wealth, destroys the letter and grants Rachmat permission to marry Atikah.

Production

Union Films was established in 1940 by ethnic Chinese businessmen Ang Hock Liem and Tjoa Ma Tjoen. After the success of its first production, Kedok Ketawa (The Laughing Mask), the director Jo An Djan left for Populair's Film. Union hired new talent, including R Hu, Rd Ariffien, and Saeroen. All three were instrumental in the production of Harta Berdarah; Hu and Ariffien served as co-directors, both in their debuts, and Saeroen—who had written the commercial successes Terang Boelan (Full Moon; 1937) and Fatima (1938) for other companies—wrote the story. Ariffien credited their hirings to Union's interest in attracting educated Native audiences.

Harta Berdarah starred Soelastri and Zonder, and featured Moesa, Oedjang, Oesman, Haroen, and Abdullah. Many of these actors, including Soelastri and Fatimah, had had roles in Kedok Ketawa, and Moesa, though only recently signed, had previously acted for another company. Zonder, who made his film debut in Harta Berdarah, was well-versed in the traditional martial art of silat, while Soelastri was also known as a keroncong singer under the stage name Miss Ning; both made use of these skills for the film, which was scored by Hugo Dumas' musical troupe Lief Java. Cinematography for the production was handled by KH Tjit.

Release and reception
Harta Berdarah was released in late October 1940, to coincide with the Eid al-Fitr holiday. The film, sometimes advertised under the Dutch title Bloedgeld, was billed as a "magnificent Indonesian action hit". A novelisation, published by the Yogyakarta-based Kolff-Buning, was later released; it includes several production stills.

Reception was positive. An anonymous review in De Indische Courant concluded that the film was simple yet well produced, with strong dialogue and humour. Another review, in the Soerabaijasch Handelsblad, was likewise positive; it found the film dissimilar to earlier domestic productions, in which "a group of stiff people moved woodenly and expelled inarticulate sounds", becoming something which could be enjoyed by anyone, "Indonesian or European alike".

Legacy
After Harta Berdarah, Union produced a further five films; all but one were directed by Hu or Ariffien. Saeroen wrote three of them, leaving for Star Film following Wanita dan Satria (1941). Most of the cast remained with Union for several productions; the company's subsequent production, Bajar dengan Djiwa (1941), for instance, again starred Zonder and Soelastri. Union Films was ultimately dissolved following the Japanese occupation of the Dutch East Indies in March 1942.

Harta Berdarah was screened as late as July 1944. The film is likely lost. All motion pictures at the time used highly flammable nitrate film, and after a fire destroyed much of Produksi Film Negara's warehouse in 1952, many films shot on nitrate were deliberately destroyed. As such, American visual anthropologist Karl G. Heider suggests that all Indonesian films from before 1950 are lost. However, JB Kristanto's Katalog Film Indonesia (Indonesian Film Catalogue) records several as having survived at Sinematek Indonesia's archives, and the film historian Misbach Yusa Biran writes that some Japanese propaganda films can be found at the Netherlands Government Information Service.

Explanatory notes

References

Works cited

 

 (clipping accessed at Sinematek Indonesia)

 

 (book acquired from the collection of Museum Tamansiswa Dewantara Kirti Griya, Yogyakarta)

External links

Indonesian black-and-white films
Films directed by Rd Ariffien
Dutch East Indies films
Lost Indonesian films
Union Films films
1940 lost films
1940 films
Indonesian action films
1940s action films
Lost action films